Liu Xiao (born 8 November 1987, Anshan) is a Chinese fencer. At the 2012 Summer Olympics, he competed in the Men's sabre, but was defeated in the second round.

References

Chinese male sabre fencers
Living people
Olympic fencers of China
Fencers at the 2012 Summer Olympics
Asian Games medalists in fencing
Fencers at the 2010 Asian Games
1987 births
Asian Games gold medalists for China
Medalists at the 2010 Asian Games
Sportspeople from Anshan
Universiade medalists in fencing
Fencers from Liaoning
Universiade gold medalists for China
Medalists at the 2009 Summer Universiade
20th-century Chinese people
21st-century Chinese people